The Tokamak Chauffage Alfvén Brésilien (TCABR) is a tokamak situated at the University of Sao Paulo (USP), Brazil. TCABR is the largest tokamak in the southern hemisphere and one of the magnetic-confinement devices committed to advancing scientific knowledge in fusion power.

History 
TCABR was originally designed and constructed in Switzerland, at the École Polytechnique Fédérale de Lausanne (EPFL), and operated there from 1980 until 1992, under the name of Tokamak Chauffage Alfvén (TCA). The main focus of TCA was to assess and enhance plasma heating with Alfvén waves. A couple of years later, the machine was transferred to USP, passing through an upgrade and adding Brésilien to its name. The operation of TCABR began in 1999.

Properties 

The TCABR plasma is made of hydrogen and has a circular format.

Research program 
The current purpose of the TCABR tokamak includes the study of Alfvén waves, but is not restricted to it. Other research areas are (i) the characterization of magnetohydrodynamic (MHD) instabilities, (ii) the study of high-confinement regimes induced by electrical polarization of external electrodes in the plasma edge, (iii) the investigation of edge turbulence, and (iv) the study of plasma poloidal and toroidal rotation using optical diagnostics. The TCABR team is also associated with a theoretical group focused on investigating instabilities and transport barriers in tokamaks and dynamical systems.

An upgrade in the TCABR is also being conducted. A set of 108 RMP coils will be installed to control and study edge localized modes (ELMs). New shaping coils will be added, allowing great flexibility in plasma configurations (e.g. single null, double null, snowflake, and negative triangularity configurations). The vacuum-vessel inner wall of TCABR will receive graphite tiles to decrease impurity deposition and energy loss in the plasma.

References 

Tokamaks